Shantipura is a village in Malia tehsil, Junagadh district, Gujarat, India. Its population is 1,973. Shantipura is believed to be the place where the ancient Shudra community of Kshatriyas first took its place as the warriors of the Koli warrior elite.

References

External links
 Village website

Villages in Junagadh district